A micellar cubic phase is a lyotropic liquid crystal phase formed when the concentration of micelles dispersed in a solvent (usually water) is sufficiently high that they are forced to pack into a structure having long-ranged positional (translational) order. For example, spherical micelles a subic packing of a body-centred cubic lattice. Normal topology micellar cubic phases, denoted by the symbol I1, are the first lyotropic liquid crystalline phases that are formed by type I amphiphiles. The amphiphiles' hydrocarbon tails are contained on the inside of the micelle and hence the polar-apolar interface of the aggregates has a positive mean curvature, by definition (it curves away from the polar phase). Inverse topology micellar cubic phases (such as the Fd3m phase) are observed for some type II amphiphiles at very high amphiphile concentrations. These aggregates, in which water is the minority phase, have a polar-apolar interface with a negative mean curvature. The structures of the normal topology micellar cubic phases that are formed by some types of amphiphiles (e.g. the oligoethyleneoxide monoalkyl ether series of non-ionic surfactants are the subject of debate. Micellar cubic phases are isotropic phases, but are distinguished from micellar solutions by their very high viscosity. When thin film samples of micellar cubic phases are viewed under a polarising microscope they appear dark and featureless. Small air bubbles trapped in these preparations tend to appear highly distorted and occasionally have faceted surfaces.

Phases of matter
Liquid crystals